Presentation College Headford is a secondary school for boys and girls in Headford, County Galway in Ireland. The school serves the town of Headford and its hinterland.  It is partnered with Dundonald High School, Belfast, in Northern Ireland.

History
The college was founded by the Presentation Sisters in 1942. It initially started in a disused army hut behind the presbytery. In 2017, it celebrated 75 years operation.

In 2007, the college began operating under the trusteeship of CEIST Catholic Education an Irish Schools Trust.

Infrastructure 
A large school gym was built in the late 1980s at a cost of £64,000 which accommodates physical education classes, theatrical acts, and other events.

The school building is antiquated and the corridors are narrow.  A new school building was built in 2010, and it houses a number of classrooms and a hall in which students can study or eat at lunch. It is also home to a state of the art table tennis hall.

There is a school canteen on campus which can seat 300 students, and employs five staff.

References 

Secondary schools in County Galway
1942 establishments in Ireland
Educational institutions established in 1942